Pacal may refer to:
 Pacal (genus), a genus of arachnid, belonging to order of schizomids (shorttailed whipscorpions), endemic to Mexico
 K'inich Janaab' Pakal AKA Pacal the Great, 7th-century ruler of the pre-Columbian Maya site of Palenque, in what is now Chiapas, Mexico
 Pacal, a Hungarian stewed tripe and onions (pacalpörkölt), see pörkölt

See also
Pakal (disambiguation)